Yog Joy (1938–1996) was an Indian photojournalist whose published works include over 1,000 pictures of news and of human interest themes in international newspapers, periodicals and books. He spent over 20 years with The Tribune, and became their photo editor.

Biography
Joy came from a humble rural background. Born in the Sargodha District of Pakistan, he completed his education from Rohtak and pursued photography.

He has been honoured with national and international awards which include the National Press Award; All India Press Photography Competition Award; 'Sakaal' Golden Jubilee National Award for outstanding news photography; The Lalit Kala Akademi's Portfolio Award, UNICEF photo awards on themes of the 'Girl Child' and 'Child needs Peace'; second prize in the UNESCO National Photo competition, second prize in "Fun with Mazda" organized by Mazda for three consecutive years (1985, 1986 and 1987); a medal in the World Photo Contest 1993 organised by UNESCO and ACCU, Japan, and first position in the Kodak Awards for Photographic Excellence in the professional category in 1998.

Exhibitions 

 A Photographic Retrospective by Yog Joy
Newspaper Photography Exhibition

References

Indian photojournalists
1938 births
1996 deaths